Mumm Islands is a group of several small islands and rocks lying  northwest of Turquet Point, Booth Island, off the west coast of Graham Land. Discovered by the French Antarctic Expedition, 1903–05, under J.B. Charcot, who applied the name.

See also 
 List of Antarctic and sub-Antarctic islands

Islands of Graham Land
Graham Coast